Eucoenogenes ancyrota is a moth of the family Tortricidae. It is found in India, Sri Lanka, Japan, Korea, Burma, Thailand, western Malaysia and Brunei.

The wingspan is 18–25 mm. Adults are on wing in mid-June. In Japan, there are two to three generations per year (in June, July and August).

The larvae feed on Ternstroemia species, including Ternstroemia japonica in Korea. The larvae feed on the leaves of the host plant, tying them together to construct shelters.

External links
Eurasian Tortricidae

Moths described in 1907
Ancyrota
Moths of Japan